Dickson is a male given name mainly found in African countries of the former British Empire. It may refer to:

Dickson Agyeman (born 1985), Belgian football midfielder
Dickson Choto (born 1981), Zimbabwean football defender playing in Poland
Dickson Chumba (born 1986), Kenyan long-distance runner
Dickson Etuhu (born 1982), Nigerian football defensive midfielder playing in England
Dickson Iroegbu, Nigerian film director and producer
Dickson Mabon (1925–2008), Scottish politician and former minister for the Labour Party
Dickson Makwaza (born 1942), Zambian football coach and international defender
Dickson Marwa (born 1982), Tanzanian long-distance runner
Dickson Matorwa (born 1975), Zimbabwean sculptor
Dickson Mua (born 1972), Solomon Islands politician and government minister
Dickson Nwakaeme (born 1986), Nigerian football forward
Dickson Poon (born 1956), Hong Kong businessman and founder of Dickson Concepts
Dickson Wamwiri (1984–2020), Kenyan taekwondo practitioner
Dickson Ntibukigwa (born 1990), Tanzanian man graduated from University of Dar es Salaam in 2015.

See also
Dickson (surname)
Dickson (disambiguation)
Dixon (surname)

Kenyan names
Nigerian names